Sunset at Chaophraya (Khu Kam) in 2013 romantic-war-drama film directed by Kittikorn Liasirikun. Adapted from the novel Khu Kam by Thommayanti, the story is a love triangle, set in World War II-era Thailand, and depicts the star-crossed romance between an Imperial Japanese Navy officer and a Thai woman who is involved with the Free Thai resistance. It was released on April 4, 2013. One of top five box office hits (Thailand film) in 2013.

Starring Nadech Kugimiya as Kobori, a Japanese Military Officer who is in the Japanese troop that invaded Siam, and Oranate D. Caballes as Angsumalin (Hideko), a young Siamese woman whose feelings towards Kobori are complicated by her strong, anti-Japanese sense of nationalism and her intention to romantically commit to a childhood friend upon his return from abroad.

The story depicts first love from the perspective of young characters, and how it affects their lives and their aspirations.

Kugimiya and Caballes made their film debut.

Plot
Set in 1939, the early days of World War II in Siam, the film begins with Angsumalin meeting for one last time with her childhood friend, a young Thai man named Vanus. He is leaving for England for schooling, and hopes that Angsumalin will wait for him and marry him when he returns.

Shortly thereafter, Thailand is invaded by Japanese military forces. In Thonburi, opposite Bangkok on the Chaophraya River, the Imperial Japanese Navy establishes a base. The forces there are led by Kobori, an idealistic young captain. One day he sees Angsumalin swimming in the river and falls for her. She, being a proudly nationalistic Thai woman, despises him because he is a foreigner.

Nonetheless, Kobori persists at seeing her and a courtship develops. Angsumalin finds that Kobori is a gentleman and starts falling for him, but she kept her feelings secret because of the war and because of her involvement with the resistance.

Then, for political reasons, Angsumalin's father - who is the leader of the Free Thai resistance, insists that she marry Kobori. Understanding that Angsumalin is not marrying him out of love, Kobori promises not to touch her, but he breaks that vow after the wedding.

Despite this, Angsumalin develops tender feelings for Kobori, but is still torn by her feelings for her nation and feeling guilty towards Vanus, upon whose return sets in motion a conflict between the two men.

Cast
 Nadech Kugimiya as Kobori
 Oranate D.Caballes as Angsumalin (in Japanese name Hideko)
 Nitis Warayanon as Vanus
 Surachai Juntimakorn as Pol
 Mongkol U-tok as Bua
 Tatsunobu Tanikawa as Yoshi
 Kullapong Boonnak as Angsumalin's father
 Mereena Mungsiri as Angsumalin's mother
 Jumnean Jareansub as Angsumalin's grandmother

Accolades

References

External links

Sunset at Chaophraya (2013) at SiamZone 
Official Website 

2013 films
2013 romantic drama films
Pacific War films
Thai-language films
2010s Japanese-language films
Films about interracial romance
Thai romantic drama films
Films based on works by Thommayanti
Films directed by Kittikorn Liasirikun